Woodrow Bennett, Jr. (born March 24, 1955) is a former professional American football player who played fullback for ten seasons for the New York Jets and Miami Dolphins.

Bennett played college football with the University of Miami before being drafted by the Jets. Cut by the Jets in 1980, he was claimed off waivers by the Dolphins and went on to start 62 games over 9 seasons.

Following his football career, Bennett became a pastor at a church in Tamarac, Florida.

References

1955 births
Living people
Sportspeople from York, Pennsylvania
American football running backs
Miami Dolphins players
New York Jets players
Miami Hurricanes football players
African-American players of American football
Players of American football from Pennsylvania
21st-century African-American people
20th-century African-American sportspeople
Ed Block Courage Award recipients